Walid Harfouch is an international television manager, producer and public figure. He is a Vice President of the international TV channel Euronews, President of the HDFashion & LifeStyle TV channel, co-founder of the Super-Nova radio station and the Paparazzi magazine.

In August 2011, Harfouch launched the Ukrainian version of the Euronews TV channel.

Walid Harfouch is the first United Nations Goodwill Ambassador authorized to fight against AIDS in Ukraine. He is a founder of the NGO "SOS Racism!"

Walid has been professionally practicing yoga for over 10 years.

Biography 

Walid Harfouch was born on April 10, 1971, in Tripoli, Lebanon. His father, Adnan Harfouch, was a professor of Arabic literature, and his mother, Najwa El Hajj, was a school director. He has an elder brother Omar and a sister, Hind.

In 1988, Harfouch finished his education at the College des Freres, and in 1990, his brother Omar invited him to come to Ukraine. In 1991, Harfouch was admitted into the Faculty of Journalism at the Oles Honchar Dnipro National University.

In 1995, Walid moved to Kiev, where he began working in the media sphere. In 2002, Walid founded the PR and BTL agency "Super-Nova", which organized a number of PR campaigns throughout Ukraine. Among Super-Nova's clients were Premier Palace Hotel, Coca-Cola, Yalta life rally, Red Bull and others. The main achievement of the agency was lobbying the interests of individuals, politicians and large companies in Ukraine, Europe and, in particular, France. 

In 2003, Walid Harfouch, together with his brother, began to publish the Paparazzi magazine about the life of show business stars and policymakers. 

In 2005 Walid Harfouch published the book "Sex, Murder, a Million".

In 2006, Walid Harfouch and his brother acquired the rights to hold three Miss Europe beauty contests. The first of them took place in October 2006 in Kyiv at the National Palace "Ukraine" and was broadcast in 12 European countries. 34 girls from different European countries took part in the competition. Ukraine at the "Miss Europe - 2006" was represented by Olena Avramenko, who received the title of the first vice-miss of Europe.

Television

TET TV channel 
In August 2007, Harfouch became the general producer of TET TV channel, one of the first private TV channels in Ukraine. Among the tasks that Harfouch outlined in his new post was raising the TV channel's rating, expanding its audience and updating the programming through new shows such as Miss CIS.

First national channel 
From March 2010 to June 2013, Walid Harfouch was Deputy General Director of Ukrainian public broadcaster NTKU. Not in this position, he was engaged in the development of musical and entertainment projects, and also established international cooperation of the First National.

Euronews and other channels 
In October 2010, Walid Harfouch became the President of the Coordinating Council of the Ukrainian version of Euronews.

On 2 August 2011 in Lyon, Euronews and Harfouch, on behalf of NTKU, jointly announced the official launch of a Ukrainian edition of Euronews with the support of the vice prime minister of Ukraine, Borys Kolesnikov, and with the advice of Ukrainian deputy Anna German. With the assistance of Harfouch, a full-fledged version of Euronews in Ukrainian was launched on 24 August.

In June 2013, Harfouch became the head of Euronews in various CIS countries.

In 2017, Harfouch acquired the HDFashion & LifeStyle TV channel.

In 2019, Harfouch moved to the position of Vice President of the international TV channel Euronews.

Radio 

In 1995, Harfouch and his brother Omar left Dnipro and moved to Kyiv where they founded one of the first FM radio stations, SuperNova.
The collaboration with Radio France International (RFI)  has allowed them to broadcast in French, English, and Arabic, as well as Russian and Ukrainian. Radio quickly gained popularity thanks to its active participation in all cultural spheres of the country, which it often initiated. Over the years, the radio has become an iconic among Kyiv youth, due to its vibrant parties. The station collaborated directly with the French Institute in Ukraine, as well as the French embassy in Ukraine. Super-Nova was the first in Ukraine to broadcast live the Cannes International Film Festival.

Social activity

Kyiv Zoo 
In 1995, a public action "Girl for Boy", organized by Walid and radio "Super-Nova" to search for the possibility of transporting a partner for the only elephant of the Kyiv Zoo, called Boy. With the money raised from a charity ball for an elephant, a bride was brought from Germany.

United Nations Goodwill Ambassador 

In 2000, Walid Harfouch became the first UN Goodwill Ambassador to fight against AIDS under the UNAIDS program. He was at the forefront of the emergence of a bronze monument in memory of the victims of AIDS, the opening of which was personally attended by the then UN Secretary General Kofi Annan. Thanks to this, the song "Protect Life", written by Omar Harfouch and produced by Walid, became known as the anthem of the fight against AIDS in Ukraine.

SOS! Racism! 

In 2007, Walid Harfouch founded the public organization "SOS! Racism!" and became its general secretary. The "SOS! Racism!" initiated many public events, such as the March Against Racism, which attracted a huge number of participants and caused a lot of attention among politicians. Thanks to the march and the support of the deputy of the Verkhovna Rada of Ukraine Anna German, a bill was submitted based on the French version on toughening the responsibility for manifestations of racism, antisemitism and xenophobia.

Regarding the 2020 George Floyd protests which were accompanied by the robbery of protesters, Harfouch commented in one of his interviews that the protests arose because of the problems of racism, and breaking into stores is looting, which casts a shadow on the bright intentions of the protest movement.

Harfouch expressed condolences to relatives and those killed in the Port of Beirut explosion in August 2020. He called on the Ukrainian community to give moral support to the Lebanese, since Ukraine has always had a great attitude towards the Lebanese republic and people.

Personal life 
In the mid-90s, Walid married Natalya Dementieva. The couple raised a son, Karim (born 1996) and a daughter, Liza (born 2000).

In 2001, Walid entered into a civil marriage with Lida Petrova, and officially married in 2015. They have three children: Emilie (born 2004), Adam (born 2012) and Adele-Chloe (born 2016).

In 2008, Walid Harfouch converted to Orthodoxy, however he remains a Buddhist in terms of philosophy and accepts all religions that promote love.

Hobbies

Yoga 
Walid Harfouch is a professional yoga practitioner and believes that yoga should be included in the school curriculum. His trainer is the famous yoga master Oksana Sivakovska. Every year on June 21, Walid celebrates International Yoga Day with his friends.

Interesting Facts 
 In 2006, at the invitation of the Ukrainian director Andrei Benkendorf, Walid starred in his film "Old Colonels" as the bandit Arthur.
 In 2019, he became a part of the photo exhibition "Spied" by photographer Victoria Smetana.

References

Further reading
 http://www.broadbandtvnews.com/2013/06/13/euronews-looks-to-cis
 Walid Harfouch joins Euronews in the CIS region
 Euronews looks to CIS
 Walid Harfouch Joins Euronews as Development Manager for the Commonwealth of Independent States region

1971 births
Living people
People from Tripoli, Lebanon
Lebanese journalists
Lebanese media executives
Naturalized citizens of Ukraine
Businesspeople from Dnipro
Ukrainian journalists
Ukrainian media executives
Ukrainian radio journalists
Ukrainian television personalities
Ukrainian people of Lebanese descent
Oles Honchar Dnipro National University alumni